The Sussex County Football Association, also simply known as Sussex County FA or Sussex FA, is the governing body of football in the county of Sussex, England. The Sussex County FA was founded on 23 September 1882 and run a number of County Cup competitions at various levels for teams all across the county.  It is affiliated to The Football Association.

History
Founded on 23 September 1882, the Sussex County FA was founded by several football clubs including Burgess Hill, Chichester City and Horsham. The 1882/83 season saw the Sussex FA create the Sussex Senior Cup, which was won for the first time by Brighton Rangers. The competition continues to run and is the longest-running football competition administered by the Sussex County FA.

Whilst the main aim of county football associations was to ensure clubs had many matches to play, a secondary aim was to help organise the recreation of schoolchildren. The Sussex County FA was formed at the time when parents in Sussex were pressing local schools to introduce games on Saturdays, with the intention of keeping children out of mischief.

In July 1981 the Sussex County FA purchased Lancing F.C., to which it moved its operations, effectively making Lancing F.C.'s home of Culver Road the headquarters of the Sussex County FA. On 2 November 1999 the Sussex County FA became incorporated as a private limited company. At this time, a new board of directors was created, with a second tier of volunteers called 'the Council', which was replaced in 2017 with 'County Members' and a series of working committees, designed to run football matters more effectively and inclusively.

County leagues
The Southern Combination Football League, formerly known as the Sussex County League until 2015 is the highest level league in Sussex with the Premier Division winners being promoted to the Isthmian League or the Southern League. There are three divisions in the SCFL; Premier Division (level 9), Division One (level 10) and Division Two (level 11). Division Two being of intermediate level and a feeder league alongside the Mid-Sussex Football League. Other feeder leagues at level 12 and below include East Sussex, West Sussex and the. Brighton Worthing & District.
 
In addition there are also Sunday leagues and Youth leagues.

Cup competitions
The Sussex County FA run several cup competitions:

Sussex Senior Challenge Cup
Sussex RUR Cup
Sussex Community Shield
Sussex Women's Challenge Cup
Sussex Intermediate Challenge Cup
Sussex Under-23 Challenge Cup
Sussex Junior Challenge Cup
Sussex Sunday Challenge Cup

There are also various other cups and trophies for all levels of football in Sussex.

Sussex Community Shield

The champions of the Southern Combination Football League and the winners of the Sussex Senior Challenge Cup play each other in this competition

Principals

References

External links

County football associations
Football in East Sussex
Football in West Sussex
1881 establishments in England
Sports organizations established in 1881